"SmartPhones" is a song by American singer Trey Songz, released on April 1, 2014, as the second single from his sixth studio album, Trigga.

Critical reception
Marcus Dowling of HipHopDX said the song was about "dealing with the moment when a man in the midst of sneaking around drunk dials his current mate and he's caught in his error". Erin Lowers of XXL complimented Songz' vocal performance on the song, and said that it offers "a glimpse at the more introspective and vulnerable side of Trey’s discography".

Charts

References

2014 singles
2014 songs
Atlantic Records singles
Songs written by Trey Songz
Trey Songz songs